This is an index of lists of historical films.

By country of origin 

 List of Estonian war films
 List of Polish war films
 List of Romanian historical films
 List of Russian historical films
 List of Vietnamese historical films

By era 

 List of films set in ancient Rome
 List of films set in ancient Greece
 List of films set in ancient Egypt
 List of war films and TV specials
 List of films about the American Revolution
 List of films set during the French Revolution and French Revolutionary Wars
 List of Napoleonic Wars films
 List of films and television shows about the American Civil War
 List of Korean War films
 List of Spanish Civil War films
 List of Vietnam War films
 List of World War I films
 List of World War II films
 List of Yugoslav Wars films

By geography 
 List of historical films set in Near Eastern and Western civilization
 List of historical films set in Asia

 
Historical
Historical